Gigantolaelaps mattogrossensis is a mite from the Americas. It has been found on the marsh rice rat (Oryzomys palustris), hispid cotton rat (Sigmodon hispidus), black rat (Rattus rattus), brown rat (Rattus norvegicus), and white-footed mouse (Peromyscus leucopus) in the United States (Florida, Georgia, South Carolina, and Texas). In Venezuela, it has been recorded from Holochilus brasiliensis, Sigmodon hirsutus, and Marmosa robinsoni. In Argentina, it has been found on Scapteromys aquaticus, Oligoryzomys flavescens, and Holochilus brasiliensis. The North American form was first described as a separate species, Gigantolaelaps cricetidarum, and is still occasionally considered as such.

References

Literature cited

 
 
 
 
 
 
 
 

Laelapidae
Animals described in 1935
Arachnids of North America
Arachnids of South America
Parasites of rodents